This is a list of Malaysian women Twenty20 International cricketers. A Twenty20 International (T20I) is an international cricket match between two representative teams. A Twenty20 International is played under the rules of Twenty20 cricket. In April 2018, the International Cricket Council (ICC) granted full international status to Twenty20 women's matches played between member sides from 1 July 2018 onwards. In addition, the ICC retrospectively gave T20I status to all matches played at the 2018 Women's Twenty20 Asia Cup, meaning that Malaysia women had made their debut in the format on 3 June 2018 against India in Kuala Lumpur.

The list is arranged in the order in which each player won her first Twenty20 cap. Where more than one player won her first Twenty20 cap in the same match, those players are listed alphabetically by surname.

Key

List of Players
Statistics are correct as of 9 October 2022.

References

 
Malaysia